"Stars Over 45" is a song by Chas & Dave which was released as a single on 6 December 1981 and entered the UK Singles Chart at No. 59. The song stayed in the charts for 8 weeks and peaked at number No. 21 on 2 January 1982.

According to Chas Hodges, the song was recorded as a "piss take" on the series of pop song medleys by Stars on 45, and chose some of the "corniest" old songs such as "When I'm Cleaning Windows", "Any Old Iron" and "The Laughing Policeman" in the medley. It was however not originally intended to be a single, only as a B-side. Hodges did not want it released as a single, and it would be their only song he regretted releasing.

See also 
 Chas & Dave discography

References

1981 singles
Novelty songs
Songs about music
Songs about musicians
Musical parodies
Satirical songs
Chas & Dave songs
1981 songs